The Paraguay women's national handball team is the team that represents Paraguay in international handball competitions and is governed by the Federacion Paraguaya de Handball.

Results

World Championship

Pan American Championship

South and Central American Championship

Central American Championship

Pan American Games

Junior Pan American Games

South American Games

Bolivarian Games

Current squad
Squad for the 2021 World Women's Handball Championship.

Head coach: Neri Vera

References

External links
IHF profile

Handball
Women's national handball teams
National team